The Pinnotheridae are a family of tiny soft-bodied crabs that live commensally in the mantles of certain bivalve molluscs (and the occasional large gastropod mollusc species in genera such as Strombus and Haliotis). Tunicotheres moseri is commensal with a tunicate. The earliest fossils attributable to the Pinnotheridae date from the Danian.

Genera and species
This is a comprehensive list of species in the family, as of 2008:

Abyssotheres
Afropinnotheres
Alarconia
Alain
Alain crosnieri
Alain raymondi Ahyong & Ng, 2008
Alainotheres
Arcotheres
Arcotheres alcocki
Arcotheres arcophilus
Arcotheres coarctatus
Arcotheres exiguus
Arcotheres guinotae
Arcotheres latifrons
Arcotheres latus
Arcotheres modiolicola
Arcotheres nudifrons
Arcotheres palaensis
Arcotheres pernicola
Arcotheres placunae
Arcotheres rayi
Arcotheres rhombifer
Arcotheres rotundatus
Arcotheres similis
Arcotheres sinensis
Arcotheres spinidactylus
Arcotheres tivelae
Arcotheres winckworthi
Austinixa
Austinixa aidae
Austinixa behreae
Austinixa bragantina
Austinixa chacei — Chace pea crab
Austinixa cristata
Austinixa felipensis
Austinixa gorei
Austinixa patagonensis
Austinotheres
Austinotheres angelicus
Buergeres
Buergeres deccanensis
Buergeres holothuriae
Buergeres ortmanni
Buergeres tenuipes
Calyptraeotheres
Calyptraeotheres garthi
Calyptraeotheres granti
Calyptraeotheres hernandezi
Calyptraeotheres politu
Clypeasterophilus
Clypeasterophilus juvenilis
Clypeasterophilus rugatus
Clypeasterophilus stebbingi
Clypeasterophilus ususfructus
Dissodactylus
Dissodactylus crinitichelis — seabiscuit pea crab
Dissodactylus glasselli
Dissodactylus latus
Dissodactylus lockingtoni
Dissodactylus mellitae — sand-dollar pea crab
Dissodactylus meyerabichi
Dissodactylus nitidus
Dissodactylus pelagicus
Dissodactylus pinna
Dissodactylus primitivus
Dissodactylus schmitti
Dissodactylus singularis
Dissodactylus speciosus
Dissodactylus tokyoensis
Dissodactylus unicornis
Dissodactylus xantusi
Durckheimia
Durckheimia caeca
Durckheimia carinipes
Durckheimia lochi
Epulotheres
Epulotheres angelae
Ernestotheres
Ernestotheres conicola
Fabia
Fabia byssomiae
Fabia canfieldi
Fabia carvachoi
Fabia concharum — smooth mussel crab
Fabia felderi
Fabia melanguena
Fabia obtusidentata
Fabia subquadrata — grooved mussel crab
Fabia tellinae
Gemmotheres
Gemmotheres chamae — jewel-box pea crab
Glassellia
Glassellia costaricana
Holotheres
Holotheres flavus
Holotheres halingi
Holotheres semperi
Holotheres setnai
Holotheres villosissimus
Holothuriophilus
Holothuriophilus mutuensis
Holothuriophilus pacificus
Holothuriophilus trapeziformis

Hospitotheres
Hospitotheres powelli
Indopinnixa
Indopinnixa mortoni
Indopinnixa sipunculana
Juxtafabia
Juxtafabia muliniarum
Limotheres
Limotheres nasutus
Nannotheres
Nannotheres moorei
Nepinnotheres
Nepinnotheres affinis
Nepinnotheres africanus
Nepinnotheres androgynus
Nepinnotheres cardii
Nepinnotheres glaberrimus
Nepinnotheres novaezelandiae — New Zealand pea crab
Nepinnotheres pectinicola
Nepinnotheres pinnotheres
Nepinnotheres rathbunae
Nepinnotheres sanqueri
Nepinnotheres tellinae
Nepinnotheres villosulus
Opisthopus
Opisthopus transversus — mottled pead crab
Orthotheres
Orthotheres glaber
Orthotheres haliotidis
Orthotheres laevis
Orthotheres longipes
Orthotheres serrei
Orthotheres strombi — conch pea crab
Orthotheres turboe
Orthotheres unguifalcula
Ostracotheres
Ostracotheres affinis
Ostracotheres cynthiae
Ostracotheres holothuriensis
Ostracotheres spondyli
Ostracotheres subglobosus
Ostracotheres tomentipes
Ostracotheres tridacnae
Parapinnixa
Parapinnixa affinis — California bay pea crab
Parapinnixa beaufortensis
Parapinnixa bouvieri
Parapinnixa cortesi
Parapinnixa cubana
Parapinnixa glasselli
Parapinnixa hendersoni
Parapinnixa magdalensis
Parapinnixa nitida
Pinnaxodes
Pinnaxodes chilensis
Pinnaxodes floridensis — polkadotted pea crab
Pinnaxodes gigas
Pinnaxodes major
Pinnaxodes tomentosus
Pinnixa
Pinnixa abbotti
Pinnixa affinis
Pinnixa arenicola
Pinnixa bahamondei
Pinnixa balanoglossa
Pinnixa barnhardti
Pinnixa brevipollex
Pinnixa californiensis
Pinnixa chaetopterana — tube pea crab
Pinnixa chiloensis
Pinnixa costaricana
Pinnixa cylindrica
Pinnixa darwini
Pinnixa eburna
Pinnixa faba — mantle pea crab
Pinnixa faxoni
Pinnixa floridana 
Pinnixa forficulimanus
Pinnixa franciscana
Pinnixa fusca
Pinnixa galliheri
Pinnixa gracilipes
Pinnixa haematosticta
Pinnixa hiatus
Pinnixa huffmani
Pinnixa latissima
Pinnixa leptodactyla
Pinnixa leptosynaptae
Pinnixa littoralis — gaper pea crab
Pinnixa longipes — longleg pea crab
Pinnixa lunzi — Lunz pea crab
Pinnixa minuscula
Pinnixa minuta
Pinnixa monodactyla — thumbless pea crab
Pinnixa occidentalis
Pinnixa paitensis
Pinnixa pearsei
Pinnixa pembertoni
Pinnixa penultipedalis
Pinnixa petersi
Pinnixa plectrophoros
Pinnixa rapax
Pinnixa rathbuni
Pinnixa rectinens
Pinnixa richardsonia
Pinnixa salvadorensis
Pinnixa sayana
Pinnixa scamit
Pinnixa schmitti — Schmitt pea crab
Pinnixa tomentosa
Pinnixa transversalis
Pinnixa tubicola
Pinnixa tumida
Pinnixa valdiviensis
Pinnixa valeri
Pinnixa vanderhorsti
Pinnixa weymouthi

Pinnotherelia
Pinnotherelia laevigata
Pinnotheres
Pinnotheres atrinae
Pinnotheres atrinicola
Pinnotheres bidentatus
Pinnotheres bipunctatus
Pinnotheres boninensis
Pinnotheres borradalei
Pinnotheres corbiculae
Pinnotheres coutieri
Pinnotheres cyclinus
Pinnotheres dilatatus
Pinnotheres dofleini
Pinnotheres edwardsi
Pinnotheres excussus
Pinnotheres globosus
Pinnotheres gordonae
Pinnotheres guerini
Pinnotheres haiyangensis
Pinnotheres hanumantharaoi
Pinnotheres hemphilli
Pinnotheres hickmani
Pinnotheres hirtimanus
Pinnotheres jamesi
Pinnotheres kamensis
Pinnotheres kutensis
Pinnotheres lanensis
Pinnotheres laquei
Pinnotheres latipes
Pinnotheres lithodomi
Pinnotheres luminatus
Pinnotheres mactricola
Pinnotheres maindromi
Pinnotheres margaritiferae
Pinnotheres nigrans
Pinnotheres obesus
Pinnotheres obscuridentata
Pinnotheres obscurus
Pinnotheres onychodactylus
Pinnotheres orcutti
Pinnotheres ostrea
Pinnotheres paralatissimus
Pinnotheres parvulus
Pinnotheres pecteni
Pinnotheres pectunculi
Pinnotheres perezi
Pinnotheres pholadis
Pinnotheres pichilinquei
Pinnotheres pilulus
Pinnotheres pilumnoides
Pinnotheres pisum — pea crab
Pinnotheres pubescens
Pinnotheres pugettensis — Puget pea crab
Pinnotheres purpureus
Pinnotheres quadratus
Pinnotheres ridgewayi
Pinnotheres rouxi
Pinnotheres sanguinolariae
Pinnotheres sebastianensis
Pinnotheres serrignathus
Pinnotheres shoemakeri
Pinnotheres siamensis
Pinnotheres socius
Pinnotheres taichungae
Pinnotheres taylori
Pinnotheres trichopus
Pinnotheres tsingtaoensis
Pinnotheres vicaji
Pseudopinnixa
Pseudopinnixa carinata
Raytheres
Raytheres clavapedatus
Sakaina
Sakaina asiatica
Sakaina incisa
Sakaina japonica
Sakaina koreensis
Sakaina yokoyai
Scleroplax
Scleroplax granulata — burrow pea crab
Serenotheres
Serenotheres besutensis
Sindheres
Sindheres karachiensis
Tetrias
Tetrias fischerii
Tetrias scabripes
Tricacnatheres
Tridacnatheres whitei
Tumidotheres
Tumidotheres maculatus — squatter pea crab
Tumidotheres margarita
Tunicotheres
Tunicotheres moseri — ascidian pea crab
Viridotheres
Viridotheres buergeri
Viridotheres gracilis
Viridotheres lillyae
Viridotheres marionae
Viridotheres otto
Viridotheres viridis
Visayeres
Visayeres acron
Waldotheres
Waldotheres mccainae
Xanthasia
Xanthasia murigera
Zaops
Zaops geddesi
Zaops ostreus

External links

 
Crabs
Danian first appearances
Taxa named by Wilhem de Haan
Extant Danian first appearances
Decapod families